Al-Qurna Sport Club, is an Iraqi football team based in Al-Qurna, Basra, that plays in Iraq Division Two.

Managerial history
  Fahad Jamil
  Hatam Ghalib

See also 
 2020–21 Iraq FA Cup
 2021–22 Iraq FA Cup

References

External links
 Al-Qurna SC on Goalzz.com
 Iraq Clubs- Foundation Dates
 Basra Clubs Union

Football clubs in Iraq
1974 establishments in Iraq
Association football clubs established in 1974
Football clubs in Basra
Basra